Erik Heil (born 10 August 1989) is a German sailor. He competes in the 49er and won a place in the Qualification for the 2016 Summer Olympics together with Thomas Plößel. They won bronze medals at the 2016 Summer Olympics and the 2020 Summer Olympics.

References

External links
 
 
 
 

1989 births
Living people
German male sailors (sport)
Olympic sailors of Germany
Olympic bronze medalists for Germany
Olympic medalists in sailing
Sailors at the 2016 Summer Olympics – 49er
Sailors at the 2020 Summer Olympics – 49er
Medalists at the 2016 Summer Olympics
Medalists at the 2020 Summer Olympics
Sportspeople from Berlin